Bakka may refer to:

Places

Lebanon
Bakka, Lebanon, a village, Roman temple and municipality in the Rashaya District, Lebanon

Norway
Bakka, Aurland, a village in Aurland Municipality in Vestland county, Norway
Bakka Church in Aurland Municipality in Vestland county, Norway
Bakka, Kvam, a village in Kvam Municipality in Vestland county, Norway
Bakka, Kvinnherad, a farm area in Kvinnherad Municipality in Vestland county, Norway

Saudi Arabia
Bakkah, also transliterated Bakka, is the ancient name for Mecca, Saudi Arabia

Pakistan
Bakka, Khyber Pakhtunkhwa, a union council in Khyber-Pakhtunkhwa province, Pakistan

People
Bakka Khel, a subtribe of the Utmanzai (Pashtun tribe)

Other
Bakka-Phoenix, a bookstore in Toronto, Canada